Rodrigo Souza Silva (born 24 November 1987), sometimes known as just Rodrigo, is a Brazilian footballer who plays as an attacking midfielder. Although he represented the Timor-Leste national team, he was later found ineligible by the Asian Football Confederation.

Club career

Youth career
Born and raised in Ipatinga, Brazil, Rodrigo Silva began his career as a football player in 2004 with Brazilian top club, Clube Atlético Mineiro where he played for the next 3 years. During his three-year spell with the Belo Horizonte-based club, he was promoted to and then brought back to the youth three times from 2004 to 2007. With the youth team, he helped the club win the Campeonato Mineiro Sub-20 (Junior) three times in a row in 2005, 2006 and 2007.

Brazil
Having shown a great performance with the youth teams of Clube Atlético Mineiro, Rodrigo Silva was promoted to the first team of the club in 2005 and was under a long-term contract of 4 years with the club.

In January 2007, he moved on a short-term loan deal of four months to Campeonato Mineiro club, Esporte Clube Democrata.

In August 2007, he moved on a one-month loan deal to Campeonato Carioca club, Tupi Football Club and then returned to his parent club, Clube Atlético Mineiro for the remaining of the 2007-08 season.

In January 2008, he again moved out of Clube Atlético Mineiro and this time on a two-month loan deal to Clube de Regatas Brasil and then moved on loan to America Football Club till June 2008. In July 2008, he moved on loan to Campeonato Brasileiro Série B club, Sociedade Esportiva do Gama where he played till November 2008.

He then played from February to May in 2009 for Santa Helena de Goiás-based, Santa Helena Esporte Clube and then returned to his parent club, Clube Atlético Mineiro for the remaining of the 2008-2009 season thus ending his five-year spell with the Belo Horizonte-based club in which he spent majority of his time with other top Brazilian clubs.

Kuwait
Rodrigo Silva first moved out of Brazil in 2009 to the Middle East and more accurately to Kuwait where he signed a one and a half-year contract with Kuwaiti Premier League club, Al-Nasr SC. He scored his first goal for the club in the 2009–10 Kuwaiti Premier League on 2 December 2009 in a 4-1 win against Kuwaiti top club, Al-Kuwait SC.

In his second consecutive season with the Al-Farwaniyah-based club, he scored his first and only goal in the 2010–11 Kuwaiti Premier League on 29 August 2010 in a 3-1 loss against Al-Qadsia SC.

United Arab Emirates

In 2010, Rodrigo Silva again moved out of Brazil to a Middle Eastern country and this time to the United Arab Emirates where he signed a two-year contract with UAE First Division League club, Al-Khaleej Club. He made his debut and scored his first goal for the club on 26 August 2010 in a 2010–11 Etisalat Emirates Cup qualification match in a 1–0 win over Al-Fujairah SC. He also made an appearance and scored a goal in the 2010–11 UAE President's Cup in Round 1 on 21 September 2010 in a 4–1 loss against Baniyas F.C. He made his UAE First Division League debut and scored his first goal in the competition on 9 December 2010 in a 3–3 draw against the Emirates Club. He scored 10 goals in 20 appearances in the 2010-11 UAE First Division League. He also scored 10 goals in 13 appearances in the qualification to the 2010–11 Etisalat Emirates Cup.

In his second consecutive season for the club, he made his first appearance for the club on 30 September 2011 in a 2011–12 Etisalat Emirates Cup qualification match in a 3–3 draw against Al-Ittihad Kalba SC. He made his first appearance and scored his first goal in the 2011-12 UAE First Division League on 24 November 2011 in a 4–0 win over Al-Urooba. He also made an appearance in the 2011–12 UAE President's Cup in Round of 16 on 18 December 2011 in a 2–1 loss against Al-Sharjah SCC. He scored 10 goals in 19 appearances in the 2011–12 UAE First Division League. He also scored made four appearances in qualification to the 2011–12 Etisalat Emirates Cup.

In 2012, he moved to the Emirate of Sharjah where he signed a one-year contract with UAE Pro-League club, Al-Shaab CSC. He first helped the Sharjah-based club qualify for the UAE Pro-League by scoring two goals in three Quartet League qualifying matches. He made his UAE Pro-League debut and scored his first goal for the club in the competition on 24 September 2012 in a 4–0 win over Al-Ittihad Kalba SC. He also made his Etisalat Emirates Cup debut on 10 October 2012 in a 6-1 loss against Al-Wahda F.C. He also made an appearance in the 2012–13 UAE President's Cup in the Round of 16 on 19 December 2012 in a 4–1 loss against Al-Wahda F.C. He scored five goals in eleven appearances in the 2012–13 UAE Pro-League and also made five appearances in the 2012–13 Etisalat Emirates Cup for the Sharjah-based club.

In 2013, he moved to Madinat Zayed where he moved to another UAE Pro-League club, Al-Dhafra SCC on a six-month loan deal. He made his debut for the club on 5 April 2013 in a 3–0 win over Ajman Club. He also made an appearance for the reserve team of the club on 10 May 2013 in a 3–2 win over the reserve team of Al-Wahda F.C. He made ten appearances for the Madinat Zayed-based club in the 2012–13 UAE Pro-League.

In June 2013, he moved to Ras al-Khaimah and on 1 July 2013 he signed a two-year contract with UAE Arabian Gulf League club, Emirates Club. He made his debut for the club on 9 September 2013 in a UAE League Cup match in a 1–1 draw against Al-Ahli Dubai F.C. He made his UAE Arabian Gulf League on 14 September 2013 in a 3–1 win over his former club, Al-Dhafra SCC and scored his first goal in the competition on 31 October 2013 in a 5–2 win over his former club, Al-Shaab CSC. He also made an appearance in the 2013–14 UAE President's Cup on 10 December 2013 in a 3–1 loss against Al-Ahli Dubai F.C. He scored 3 goals in 25 appearances in the 2013–14 Arabian Gulf League. He also made 5 appearances in the 2013–14 UAE Arabian Gulf Cup.

In his second consecutive season for the club, he made his first appearance on 15 September 2014 in a 1–0 win over Al-Fujairah SC and scored his first goal of the season on 5 October 2014 in a 1–1 draw against his former club, Al-Dhafra SCC. He made his first appearance in the 2014–15 UAE Arabian Gulf Cup on 5 November 2014 in a 2–1 loss against Baniyas F.C. and scored his first goal in his second game in the competition on 11 November 2014 in a 2–2 draw against Al-Fujairah SC.

Club career statistics

International career
On 19 January 2017, the Asian Football Confederation declared Rodrigo and eleven other Brazilian footballers ineligible to represent East Timor.

International goals
Scores and results list East Timor's goal tally first.

Honours

Club
With Atlético Mineiro (As a Youth Team player)
Campeonato Mineiro Sub-20 (3): 2005, 2006, 2007

With Democrata
Campeonato do Interior de Minas Gerais (1): 2007

Contract
CRB (Loan) 2 January 2008 to 30 November 2008
Atlético Mineiro 12 April 2004 to 6 April 2009

References

External links

Rodrigo Souza Silva at Eurosport
Rodrigo Silva at WhoScored.com
Rodrigo Souza Silva at SoccerPunter

Rodrigo Souza Silva at FA-Net

1987 births
Living people
People from Ipatinga
Brazilian footballers
Brazilian expatriate footballers
Association football midfielders
Clube Atlético Mineiro players
Tupi Football Club players
Clube de Regatas Brasil players
Al-Nasr SC (Kuwait) players
Al-Shaab CSC players
Al Dhafra FC players
Emirates Club players
Hatta Club players
Ajman Club players
Khor Fakkan Sports Club players
Dibba Al-Hisn Sports Club players
Al Urooba Club players
Al Bataeh Club players
Daegu FC players
K League 1 players
Expatriate footballers in Kuwait
Brazilian expatriate sportspeople in Kuwait
Expatriate footballers in the United Arab Emirates
Brazilian expatriate sportspeople in the United Arab Emirates
Expatriate footballers in South Korea
Brazilian expatriate sportspeople in South Korea
UAE First Division League players
UAE Pro League players
Kuwait Premier League players

East Timorese footballers
Timor-Leste international footballers
Sportspeople from Minas Gerais